Luke Montz (born July 7, 1983) is an American professional baseball manager and former catcher. He played in Minor League Baseball from 2003 to 2015, and played a total of 23 games in Major League Baseball (MLB) for the Washington Nationals and Oakland Athletics.

Playing career

Washington Nationals
Montz was drafted by the then-Montreal Expos in the 17th round of the 2003 Major League Baseball draft. He played in the minor leagues from 2003 through 2008, progressing from Rookie League to Triple-A. Montz made his major league debut on September 4, 2008, for the Washington Nationals against the Atlanta Braves; in that game, he went 0-for-3. Through the end of the 2008 season, Montz appeared in 10 games with the Nationals, batting 3-for-21 (.143). He spent the 2009 season in Washington's farm system.

2010–2012 seasons
Montz signed a minor-league contract with the New York Mets for the 2010 season and with the then-Florida Marlins for the 2011 season. He re-signed with the Marlins for the 2012 season. In 2012, he played for the Triple-A New Orleans Zephyrs, splitting his time between catching and playing first base. For the year, he slashed .222/.310/.495 with 29 home runs and 74 RBIs.

Oakland Athletics

Montz signed a minor league contract with the Oakland Athletics in November 2012. During the 2013 season, he appeared in 13 games for Oakland, batting 5-for-28 (.179). He was designated for assignment on September 1, 2013. He was released on September 3, 2013, re-signed in October 2013, and played briefly during the 2014 season for Oakland's Arizona League rookie team.

2015 season
On December 4, 2014, Montz signed a minor-league deal with the Boston Red Sox. On December 17, 2014, he was assigned to the Triple-A Pawtucket Red Sox. He appeared in 48 games with Pawtucket, then was released on June 27, 2015.

Post-playing career
Montz spent 2018 as a coach with the Portland Sea Dogs, the Boston Red Sox' Double-A affiliate in the Eastern League.
In January 2019, he was named manager of the Lowell Spinners, Boston's Class A Short Season affiliate in the New York–Penn League. In January 2021, following MLB's realignment of the minor leagues, he was named manager of Boston's Class A affiliate, the Salem Red Sox. After managing Salem for two seasons, Montz left the Red Sox organization in October 2022. In January 2023, he was named manager of the San Antonio Missions, the San Diego Padres' Double-A affiliate in the Texas League.

Personal life
Montz, his wife, and their two daughters live in Lafayette, Louisiana.

References

External links

1983 births
Living people
Baseball players from Louisiana
Major League Baseball catchers
Washington Nationals players
Oakland Athletics players
Lowell Spinners managers
San Antonio Missions managers
Gulf Coast Expos players
Vermont Expos players
Brevard County Manatees players
Savannah Sand Gnats players
Potomac Nationals players
Harrisburg Senators players
Columbus Clippers players
Syracuse Chiefs players
Binghamton Mets players
Gulf Coast Mets players
St. Lucie Mets players
Jacksonville Suns players
Gigantes del Cibao players
American expatriate baseball players in the Dominican Republic
New Orleans Zephyrs players
Águilas de Mexicali players
American expatriate baseball players in Mexico
Sacramento River Cats players
Arizona League Athletics players
Hill College Rebels baseball players
Baseball coaches from Louisiana